The 2016 Real Salt Lake Women season is the team's fifth year of existence in its current incarnation and their first season in United Women's Soccer, the second division of the American soccer pyramid.

Background

Competitions

Preseason

UWS regular season

Standings

United Women's Soccer Western Conference table

Results summary

Results by round

Match results

Club

Roster
As of May 29, 2016.

References

2016 United Women's Soccer season
2016
2016 in sports in Utah
American soccer clubs 2016 season